The 1996–97 MetJHL season is the 6th season of the Metro Junior A Hockey League (MetJHL). The 16 teams of the Central, Eastern, and Western Divisions competed in a 50-game schedule.  The top 12 teams made the playoffs.

The winner of the MetJHL playoffs, the Aurora Tigers, could not move into national playdowns as the Metro was not a member of the Ontario Hockey Association.

Milestones
On February 21, 1997, the Muskoka Bears' Ryan Venturelli became the first known goaltender in hockey history to score two goals (both empty net) in a hockey game against the Durham Huskies during the Metro Junior A Hockey League 1996-97 regular season.

Changes
League switches from 2 divisions to 3, adding Central Division
Durham Huskies, Quinte Hawks, Syracuse Jr. Crunch, and Port Hope Buzzards join the MetJHL
Shelburne Hornets become Shelburne Wolves

Final standings
Note: GP = Games played; W = Wins; L = Losses; OTL = Overtime losses; SL = Shootout losses; GF = Goals for; GA = Goals against; PTS = Points; x = clinched playoff berth; y = clinched division title; z = clinched conference title

1996-97 MetJHL Playoffs
Division Semi-final
Wexford Raiders defeated Niagara Scenics 4-games-to-none
Thornhill Islanders defeated Markham Waxers 4-games-to-3
Pickering Panthers defeated Oshawa Legionaires 4-games-to-2
Quinte Hawks defeated Wellington Dukes 4-games-to-1
Aurora Tigers defeated Durham Huskies 4-games-to-none
Caledon Canadians defeated Muskoka Bears 4-games-to-none
Interdivision Round Robin

Semi-final
Caledon Canadians defeated Wexford Raiders 4-games-to-none
Aurora Tigers defeated Quinte Hawks 4-games-to-2
Final
Aurora Tigers defeated Caledon Canadians 4-games-to-none

Scoring leaders
Note: GP = Games played; G = Goals; A = Assists; Pts = Points; PIM = Penalty minutes

Leading goaltenders
Starting goaltenders only (1000 minutes or over).

Note: GP = Games played; Mins = Minutes played; W = Wins; L = Losses: OTL = Overtime losses; SL = Shootout losses; GA = Goals Allowed; SO = Shutouts; GAA = Goals against average

See also
 1997 Royal Bank Cup
 Dudley Hewitt Cup
 List of Ontario Hockey Association Junior A seasons
 Ontario Junior A Hockey League
 Northern Ontario Junior Hockey League
 1996 in ice hockey
 1997 in ice hockey

References

External links
 Official website of the Ontario Junior Hockey League
 Official website of the Canadian Junior Hockey League

Metro Junior A Hockey League seasons
MetJHL